Warren Kornfeld is an American bridge player.

Bridge accomplishments

Wins

 North American Bridge Championships (1)
 Blue Ribbon Pairs (1) 1972

Runners-up

Notes

American contract bridge players
Possibly living people
Year of birth missing